James Toohey (1827-1883) was a prominent Irish-Australian land owner of the early colony of Brisbane.

Early life 
James Toohey was born in Galway, Ireland in 1826, the son of Peter and Bridget Toohey (nee Dirnan). His father served as an officer in the British Army in North America and after retirement, in 1832 brought his family to New Norfolk, Tasmania near to the penal colony of Hobart. In 1836 his father Peter, went to New Zealand in search of work as a cooper. James, his mother and three of his siblings remained in Tasmania until November 1837 when the family moved to Sydney, Australia. Peter supported his family until he drowned in a river in the Bay of Islands area of New Zealand in 1840.   

James Toohey joined the 1849 Gold Rush of California where he made his fortune as a blacksmith. He returned to Australia in 1853 and settled in Brisbane, Queensland. James married Anne Dogherty, daughter of John Dogherty and Fanny Cavanagh, on 30 August 1859 at St Stephens Cathedral in Brisbane, Queensland.

Land speculation 
Toohey opened a blacksmith's shop in Kangaroo Point and attended the land auctions. After fires destroyed much of early Brisbane city, Toohey was able to add to his property holdings, with acquisitions in South Brisbane, Kangaroo Point, Holland Park, Greenslopes, Tarragindi and Nathan, the current Griffith University Site. He built a large home in 1874 on land off Logan Road named "Mount Galway" and had a track (now Toohey Road) to Toohey Mountain. He leased and then freeholded land under "The Settled Land Act" in what is now Toohey Forest Park, Mount Gravatt Cemetery, Queen Elizabeth Sports and Athletics Centre and Griffith University, and ultimately held possession of the Toohey Forest area.

Legacy 
James Toohey died on 22 November 1883 and was buried in Dutton Park Cemetery and later moved twice more to Toohey Forest Park and the Mt Gravatt Cemetery. His will protected land comprising the Toohey Forest area from being sold off after his death within his children's and wife's lifetime. The family's Irish Catholicism made them subject to discrimination. The properties of Toohey were either subdivided/sold by the remaining family members or sold back to the Crown. 

Toohey Forest Park and the Mt Gravatt Cemetery reflect the family's history within the region. An incorrect account of the history of Peter Toohey (James' father) was detailed in James Toohey: Brisbane Pioneer or First of the White Shoe Brigade, as the author researched a 'Patrick Toohey', not Peter. This led to the family requesting a retraction based on incorrect information that led to an assumption of adultery and a supposed 'discreet ruse' by the family to cover Peter's absence when he had in fact passed away in 1840 around the Bay of Islands area in New Zealand.

References

1827 births
1883 deaths
Australian prospectors
People from Brisbane
People from County Galway